The 1998 Swedish Touring Car Championship season was the 3rd Swedish Touring Car Championship (STCC) season. It was decided over six race weekends (comprising twelve races) at five different circuits.

Fredrik Ekblom won his first championship for the BMW Dealer Team.

Entry list

Race calendar and winners
All rounds were held in Sweden.

Championship standings

Drivers' Championship
Points were awarded to the top ten drivers in a race as follows: 20, 15, 12, 10, 8, 6, 4, 3, 2, 1.
5 points were awarded to any driver who took part in qualifying. 
Top 6 finishers in Race 1 were reversed to decide the Race 2 grid.
The final meeting of the year saw double points awarded.

Synsam Cup for Privateers

References

External links
STCC 1998 Entry List
Touring-cars.net

Swedish Touring Car Championship seasons
Swedish Touring Car Championship
Swedish Touring Car Championship season